The CUNY Graduate School of Public Health & Health Policy (commonly known as the CUNY School of Public Health, or CUNY SPH) is a public American research and professional college within the borders of City University of New York (CUNY) system of colleges. The school is situated at 55 West 125th Street in Manhattan. CUNY SPH offers doctoral programs, master's programs, several certificates, and faculty memberships in many of CUNY's research centers and institutes. A core roster of over 50 full-time faculty is supplemented by additional faculty members drawn from throughout CUNY.

Academics 
CUNY SPH is accredited by the Council on Education for Public Health (CEPH). The Accreditation Board for Engineering Technology (ABET) accredits the MS-EOHS program.

CUNY SPH offers a variety of accredited master's and doctorate degrees, specializations, and certificates.

CUNY SPH offers the following graduate degrees
 Master's Degree Programs
 MPH in Community Health
 MPH in Environmental and Occupational Health Sciences
 MPH in Epidemiology and Biostatistics
 MPH in Health Policy and Management
 MPH in Public Health Nutrition
 MS in Environmental and Occupational Health Sciences
 MS in Global and Migrant Health Policy
 MS in Population Health Informatics
 MS in Health Communication for Social Change 
 Doctoral Degree Programs
 PhD in Community Health and Health Policy
 PhD in Environmental and Planetary Health Sciences
 PhD in Epidemiology

CUNY SPH offers the following specializations
 Maternal, Child, Reproductive, and Sexual Health (This specialization is available to both master's and doctoral students.)

CUNY SPH offers the following certificates
 Advanced Certificate in Public Health
 Advanced Certificate in Industrial Hygiene
 Population Health Informatics Certificate
 Certificate in Social Marketing for Health

Affiliations
CUNY SPH faculty are affiliated with the following CUNY research centers and institutes:
 CUNY Urban Food Policy Institute
 CUNY Institute for Implementation Science in Population Health
 Center for Immigrant, Refugee, and Global Health
 Healthy CUNY Initiative
 Center for Innovation in Mental Health
 CUNY Center for Systems and Community Design
 NYU-CUNY Research Prevention Center

History 
In September 2006, the chancellor of The City University of New York, Matthew Goldstein, announced that CUNY planned to create a collaborative School of Public Health to open within five years. The school would have an urban focus and bring together the University’s public health programs at Brooklyn, Lehman and Hunter Colleges and the Graduate Center, as well as other faculty with relevant expertise from around the University. The chancellor designated Hunter College as the lead institution because it had the largest and oldest public health program, accredited by the Council on Education for Public Health, the national body that accredits public health programs and schools, since 1972.

In October 2009, the Council on Education for Public Health accepted CUNY’s application to be reviewed for transforming its accredited programs in public health into a single School of Public Health. That review process began 2010 and was completed in 2011.

In September 2013, Ayman El-Mohandes was named Dean.

In November 2015, the CUNY Trustees approved a new structure for the CUNY School of Public Health, setting in motion the transition from a consortial model comprising programs at four different CUNY schools, into the unified CUNY Graduate School of Public Health & Health Policy.

References

External links
 

Public Health
Universities and colleges in Manhattan
Schools of public health in the United States
Educational institutions established in 2007
2007 establishments in New York City
Medical and health organizations based in New York City
Education in Harlem